Laal Ishq (English: Red love) is a Pakistani drama serial aired on A-Plus TV channel. It is directed by Dilawar Malik and written by Khalil-ur-Rehman Qamar, premiered on 14 October 2017. It is a sequel to the 2002 drama serial Landa Bazar. Babar Ali, Kashif Mehmood, Waseem Abbas, Tauqeer Nasir reprised their roles from the 2002 series whereas newcomers like Aabi Khan, Arslan Idrees also joined the cast.

Plot 
Laal Ishq is a story about the aftermath of what happened 22 years ago.  It's a story about love, hate, anger, and revenge and how a single murder affects everyone. Baali (Iqbal) comes out after serving 22 years in prison for the murder of Mehr Hukam. Completely changed from being a strong, and angry man to being week aek and emotional, Baali goes in search for his kids. Everyone thinks that Baali is dead but one day the "Mehr’s" (Hukam's family) find out the Baali is alive and out of prison. That day marks the start of journey of Mehr Punaar to murder baali as his mother fasts every day for 22 years. She will break that chain if baali dies, so Mehr Punaar and His maternal uncle "Mamo Muneer" embark on vendetta but eventually he and his sister Maahi falls Iove with Baali's children who don't know about Baali and thinks Iqbal (who changed his name from Ejaz to Iqbal) to be their father. Ejaz/Iqbal wants Rameen and Farhad to stay away from Mehrs and to find out truth about him and the murder Baali committed.

Cast 
 Babar Ali as Iqbal (Baali)
 Kashif Mehmood as Ejaz (Jajji)
 Waseem Abbas as Mehr Charagh
 Tauqeer Nasir as Yawar Kamal
 Saba Hameed as Mehrunnissa
 Arslan Idrees as Farhad Iqbal
 Faryal Mehmood as Mahi
 Aabi Khan (Durab Khalil) as Punaar
 Anzela Abbasi as Rameen
 Mahjabeen Habib as Fakhara
 Junaid Malhi as Mouju
 Khalid Butt as (Teacher)

Music 
"Ishq Toh Laal Hai" by Rahat Fateh Ali Khan
Written by Khalil-ur-Rehman Qamar
"Jandi Wari Ohnon Akhoo" by Shafaqat Ali Khan
"Tujhe Yaad Hain Zamanay"

References 

Pakistani drama television series
Urdu-language television shows
Punjabi-language television shows
2017 Pakistani television series debuts
2018 Pakistani television series endings